Pesampator (developmental code names BIIB-104 and PF-04958242) is a positive allosteric modulator (PAM) of the AMPA receptor (AMPAR), an ionotropic glutamate receptor, which is under development by Pfizer for the treatment of cognitive symptoms in schizophrenia. It was also under development for the treatment of age-related sensorineural hearing loss, but development for this indication was terminated due to insufficient effectiveness. As of July 2018, pesampator is in phase II clinical trials for cognitive symptoms in schizophrenia.

Pesampator belongs to the biarylpropylsulfonamide group of AMPAR PAMs, which also includes LY-404187, LY-503430, and mibampator (LY-451395) among others. It is described as a "high-impact" AMPAR PAM, unlike so-called "low-impact" AMPAR PAMs like CX-516 and its cogener farampator (CX-691, ORG-24448). In animals, low doses of pesampator have been found to enhance cognition and memory, whereas higher doses produce motor coordination disruptions and convulsions. The same effects, as well as neurotoxicity at higher doses, have been observed with orthosteric and other high-impact allosteric AMPAR activators.

In healthy volunteers, pesampator has been found to significantly reduce ketamine-induced deficits in verbal learning and working memory without attenuating ketamine-induced psychotomimetic effects. It was able to complete reverse ketamine-induced impairments in spatial working memory in the participants.

In addition to its actions on the AMPAR, pesampator has been reported to act as a GlyT1 glycine transporter blocker. As such, it is also a glycine reuptake inhibitor, and may act indirectly to activate the glycine receptor and the glycine co-agonist site of the NMDA receptor by increasing extracellular levels of glycine.

See also
 AMPA receptor positive allosteric modulator
 List of investigational antipsychotics

References

AMPA receptor positive allosteric modulators
Experimental drugs
Glycine reuptake inhibitors
Nitriles
Nootropics
Sulfonamides
Tetrahydrofurans
Thiophenes